United States Coast Guard Station New Bedford was a United States Coast Guard station located in New Bedford, Massachusetts.  It was originally as station of the Revenue Cutter Service.

The Revenue Cutter Active was a 90 foot, 120 ton schooner which served at New Bedford from her commissioning in 1867 until she was sold in 1875.  She was one of the last strictly sail powered cutters built for the Revenue Cutter Service.

From 1876 to 1900 New Bedford was the home of the School of Instruction of the Revenue Cutter Service, predecessor of the United States Coast Guard Academy.

From 1964 to 1979 the Station was the homeport of the Reliance class cutter Vigilant.  Vigilant was replaced by a Famous class cutter.

The station was a sub-unit of Coast Guard Sector Southeast New England located in Coast Guard District One.

The station was closed in 2003 and its assets were relocated.

See also
 List of military installations in Massachusetts

External links
Welcome to the U.S. Coast Guard First District
Lang: Stowaway incident highlights need for Coast Guard presence

New Bedford, Massachusetts
United States Coast Guard stations
Buildings and structures in Bristol County, Massachusetts
Military installations in Massachusetts
Closed facilities of the United States Coast Guard